Paulin Joseph Bordeleau (born January 29, 1953) is a Canadian-born French former professional ice hockey forward.

Playing career
Born in Noranda, Quebec, Bordeleau started his National Hockey League career with the Vancouver Canucks in 1973. He spent his entire NHL career with the Canucks. He left the NHL after the 1976 season and jumped to the World Hockey Association.  There, he played for the Quebec Nordiques.  He then finished his career in the French Ligue Magnus. He played for France at the 1988 Winter Olympics.

Personal life
His son, Sébastien, was a professional ice hockey player, while his grandson Thomas, currently plays ice hockey for the San Jose Sharks.

Paulin was one of three brothers playing professional hockey in the 1970s with J. P. Bordeleau playing for the Chicago Black Hawks and Christian Bordeleau starring for the Quebec Nordiques of the WHA.

Career statistics

Regular season and playoffs

International

External links 

HOCKEY: Paulin Bordeleau quitte le LHC  

1953 births
Canadian ice hockey centres
Diables Noirs de Tours players
Fredericton Canadiens players
French Quebecers
Ice hockey people from Quebec
Ice hockey players at the 1988 Winter Olympics
Laval Titan coaches
Living people
Montreal Junior Canadiens players
Olympic ice hockey players of France
Quebec Nordiques (WHA) players
Sportspeople from Rouyn-Noranda
Tampa Bay Lightning coaches
Toronto Marlboros players
Toronto Toros draft picks
Tulsa Oilers (1964–1984) players
Vancouver Canucks draft picks
Vancouver Canucks players
World Hockey Association first round draft picks
Canadian expatriate ice hockey players in the United States
Canadian ice hockey coaches